The 1974–75 Connecticut Huskies men's basketball team represented the University of Connecticut in the 1974–75 collegiate men's basketball season. The Huskies completed the season with an 18–10 overall record. The Huskies were members of the Yankee Conference, where they ended the season with a 9–3 record. They made it to the first round in the 1975 National Invitation Tournament. The Huskies played their home games at Hugh S. Greer Field House in Storrs, Connecticut, and were led by sixth-year head coach Dee Rowe.

Schedule 

|-
!colspan=12 style=""| Regular season

|-
!colspan=12 style=""| ECAC tournament

|-
!colspan=12 style=""| NIT

Schedule Source:

References 

UConn Huskies men's basketball seasons
Connecticut
Connecticut
1974 in sports in Connecticut
1975 in sports in Connecticut